Chenab Express is a passenger train operated daily by Pakistan Railways between Sargodha and Lala Musa. The train named after the Chenab River.

Route 
 Sargodha Junction–Lala Musa Junction via Shorkot–Lalamusa Branch Line

Station stops

Equipment 
Chenab Express only offers economy class seating.

References 

Named passenger trains of Pakistan
Passenger trains in Pakistan